Metuchen is a New Jersey Transit station located  southwest of New York Penn Station  on the Northeast Corridor Line, in Metuchen, New Jersey. It is on Main Street between Pennsylvania and Woodbridge Avenues; the platforms are on an overpass over Main Street. The New York City-bound platform and station office are accessible from Woodbridge Avenue, while the Trenton-bound platform is accessible from Pennsylvania Avenue. There is a station office but no station agents and passengers must use a ticket machine. There is a newsstand in the waiting room of the northbound platform that operates on weekday mornings during rush hour. A private concierge service operated between 2001–2003, but is now closed. There is, however, a taxi stand on Pennsylvania Avenue across from the station.

History

The station was built in 1888 by the Pennsylvania Railroad and it was significantly renovated in 1979.

Station layout
The station has two high-level side platforms. Most of Amtrak's Northeast Corridor services bypass the station via the inner tracks.

References

External links

Metuchen, New Jersey
NJ Transit Rail Operations stations
Stations on the Northeast Corridor
Railway stations in the United States opened in 1888
Railway stations in Middlesex County, New Jersey
Former Pennsylvania Railroad stations
Former Amtrak stations in New Jersey